Count Dracula is the title character of Bram Stoker's 1897 gothic horror novel Dracula. He is considered to be both the prototypical and the archetypal vampire in subsequent works of fiction. Aspects of the character are believed by some to have been inspired by the 15th-century Wallachian Prince Vlad the Impaler, who was also known as Dracula, and by Sir Henry Irving, an actor for whom Stoker was a personal assistant.

One of Dracula's most iconic powers is his ability to turn others into vampires by biting them and infecting them with the vampiric disease. Other character aspects have been added or altered in subsequent popular fictional works. The character has appeared frequently in popular culture, from films to animated media to breakfast cereals.

Stoker's creation
Bram Stoker's novel takes the form of an epistolary tale, in which Count Dracula's characteristics, powers, abilities, and weaknesses are narrated by multiple narrators, from different perspectives.

Count Dracula is an undead, centuries-old vampire, and a Transylvanian nobleman who claims to be a Székely descended from Attila the Hun. He inhabits a decaying castle in the Carpathian Mountains near the Borgo Pass. Unlike the vampires of Eastern European folklore, which are portrayed as repulsive, corpse-like creatures, Dracula is handsome and charismatic, with a veneer of aristocratic charm. In his conversations with Jonathan Harker, he reveals himself as deeply proud of his boyar heritage and nostalgic for the past, which he admits has become only a memory of heroism, honour, and valour in modern times.

Early life

Details of his early life are undisclosed, but it is mentioned that

Dracula studied the black arts at the academy of Scholomance in the Carpathian Mountains, overlooking the town of Sibiu (also known as Hermannstadt) and has a deep knowledge of alchemy and magic. Taking up arms, as befitting his rank and status as a voivode, he led troops against the Turks across the Danube. According to his nemesis Abraham Van Helsing, "He must indeed have been that Voivode Dracula who won his name against the Turk, over the great river on the very frontier of Turkey-land. If it be so, then was he no common man: for in that time, and for centuries after, he was spoken of as the cleverest and the most cunning, as well as the bravest of the sons of the land beyond the forest." Dead and buried in a great tomb in the chapel of his castle, Dracula returns from death as a vampire and lives for several centuries in his castle with three terrifyingly beautiful female vampires beside him.

Narrative

Short story

In "Dracula's Guest", the narrative follows an unnamed Englishman traveller as he wanders around Munich before leaving for Transylvania. It is Walpurgis Night and the young Englishman foolishly leaves his hotel, in spite of the coachman's warnings, and wanders through a dense forest alone. Along the way, he feels that he is being watched by a tall and thin stranger.

The short story climaxes in an old graveyard, where the Englishman encounters a sleeping female vampire called Countess Dolingen in a marble tomb with a large iron stake driven into it. This malevolent and beautiful vampire awakens from her marble bier to conjure a snowstorm before being struck by lightning and returning to her eternal prison. However, the Englishman's troubles are not quite over, as he is dragged away by an unseen force and rendered unconscious. He awakens to find a "gigantic" wolf lying on his chest and licking at his throat; however, the wolf merely keeps him warm and protects him until help arrives. When the Englishman is finally taken back to his hotel, a telegram awaits him from his expectant host Dracula, with a warning about "dangers from snow and wolves and night".

Novel
In Dracula, the eponymous vampire has decided to move from Transylvania to London. He summons Jonathan Harker, a newly qualified English solicitor, to provide legal support for a real estate transaction overseen by Harker's employer. Dracula at first charms Harker with his cordiality and historical knowledge, and even rescues him from the clutches of the three female vampires in the castle. In truth, however, Dracula merely wishes to keep Harker alive long enough to complete the legal transaction and to learn as much as possible about England.

Dracula leaves his castle and boards a Russian ship, the Demeter, taking along with him 50 boxes of Transylvanian soil, which he needs to regain his strength and rest during daylight. During the voyage to Whitby, a coastal town in northern England, he sustains himself on the ship's crew members. Only one body is later found, that of the captain, who is found tied up to the ship's helm. The captain's log is recovered and tells of strange events that had taken place during the ship's journey. Dracula leaves the ship in the form of a dog and runs up the 199 steps to the graveyard of St Mary's Church in the shadow of the Whitby Abbey ruins.

Soon, the Count begins menacing Harker's fiancée, Wilhelmina "Mina" Murray, and her friend, Lucy Westenra. There is also a notable link between Dracula and Renfield, a patient in an insane asylum overseen by John Seward, who is compelled to consume spiders, birds, and other creatures—in ascending order of size—to absorb their "life force". Renfield acts as a kind of sensor, reacting to Dracula's proximity and supplying clues accordingly. Dracula visits Lucy's bed chamber on a nightly basis, draining her of blood while simultaneously infecting her with the curse of vampirism. Not knowing the cause for Lucy's deterioration, her three suitors – Seward, Arthur Holmwood and Quincey Morris – call upon Seward's mentor, the Dutch doctor Abraham Van Helsing. Van Helsing soon deduces her condition's supernatural origins, and tries to keep the vampire at bay with garlic. Nevertheless, Dracula attacks Lucy's house one final time, killing her mother and transforming Lucy herself into one of the undead.

Harker escapes Dracula's castle and returns to England, barely alive and deeply traumatized. On Seward's suggestion, Mina seeks Van Helsing's assistance in assessing Harker's health. She reads his journal and passes it along to Van Helsing. This unfolds the first clue to the identity of Lucy's assailant, which later prompts Mina to collect all of the events of Dracula's appearance in news articles, saved letters, newspaper clippings and the journals of each member of the group. This assists the group in investigating Dracula's movements and later discovering that Renfield's behaviour is directly influenced by Dracula. They then discover that Dracula has purchased a residence next door to Seward's. The group gathers intelligence to track down Dracula and destroy him.

After the undead Lucy attacks several children, Van Helsing, Seward, Holmwood and Morris enter her crypt and destroy her to save her soul. Later, Harker joins them, and the party works to discover Dracula's intentions. Harker aids the party in tracking down the locations of the boxes to the various residences of Dracula and discovers that Dracula purchased multiple real estate properties throughout London under the alias 'Count De Ville'. Dracula's main plan was to move each of his 50 boxes of earth to his various properties in order to arrange multiple lairs throughout and around the perimeter of London.

The party pries open each of the graves, places sacramental wafers within each of them, and seals them shut. This deprives Dracula of his ability to seek safety in those boxes. Dracula gains entry into Seward's residence by coercing an invitation out of Renfield. As he attempts to enter the room in which Harker and Mina are staying, Renfield tries to stop him; Dracula then mortally wounds him. With his dying breath, Renfield tells Seward and Van Helsing that Dracula is after Mina. Van Helsing and Seward discover Dracula biting Mina and forcing her to drink his blood. The group repels Dracula using crucifixes and sacramental bread, forcing him to flee by turning into a dark vapour. The party continues to hunt Dracula to search for his remaining lairs. Although Dracula's 'baptism' of Mina grants him a telepathic link to her, it backfires when Van Helsing hypnotizes Mina and uses her supernatural link with Dracula to track him as he flees back to Transylvania.

The heroes follow Dracula back to Transylvania, and in a climactic battle with Dracula's Romani bodyguards, finally destroy him. Despite the popular image of Dracula having a stake driven through his heart to kill him, Mina's narrative describes his decapitation by Harker's kukri while Morris simultaneously pierces his heart with a Bowie knife (Mina Harker's Journal, 6 November, Dracula Chapter 27). His body then turns into dust, but not before Mina sees an expression of peace on his face.

Characteristics

Although early in the novel Dracula dons a mask of cordiality, he often flies into fits of rage when his plans are frustrated. When Dracula's brides attempt to seduce Jonathan Harker, Dracula physically assaults one and ferociously berates them for their insubordination.

He has an appreciation for ancient architecture, and when purchasing a home he prefers them to be aged, saying "A new home would kill me", and that to make a new home habitable to him would take a century.

Dracula is very proud of his warrior heritage, proclaiming his pride to Harker on how the Székely people are infused with the blood of heroes. He also expresses an interest in the history of the British Empire, speaking admiringly of its people. He has a somewhat primal and predatory worldview; he pities ordinary humans for their revulsion to their darker impulses. He is not without human emotions, however; he often says that he too can love.

Though usually portrayed as having a strong Eastern European accent, the original novel only specifies that his spoken English is excellent, though strangely toned.

His appearance varies in age. He is described early in the novel as thin, with a long white moustache, pointed ears and sharp teeth. It is also noted later in the novel (Chapter 11 subsection "The Escaped Wolf") by a zookeeper who sees him that he has a hooked nose and a pointed beard with a streak of white in it. He is dressed all in black and has hair on his palms. Harker describes him as an old man, "cruel looking" and giving an effect of "extraordinary pallor".

As the novel progresses, Dracula is described as taking on a more and more youthful appearance. After Harker strikes him with a shovel, he is left with a scar on his forehead which he bears throughout the course of the novel.

Dracula also possesses great wealth, and has Romani people in his homeland who are loyal to him as servants and protectors.

Powers and weaknesses

Count Dracula is portrayed in the novel using many different supernatural abilities, and is believed to have gained his abilities through dealings with the devil. Chapter 18 of the novel describes many of the abilities, limitations and weaknesses of vampires and Dracula in particular. Dracula has superhuman strength which, according to Van Helsing, is equivalent to that of 20 strong men. He does not cast a shadow or have a reflection from mirrors. He is immune to conventional means of attack; a sailor tries to stab him in the back with a knife, but the blade goes through his body as though it is air. He can defy gravity to a certain extent and possesses superhuman agility, able to climb vertical surfaces upside down in a reptilian manner. He can travel onto "unhallowed" ground, such as the graves of suicides and those of his victims. He has powerful hypnotic, telepathic and illusionary abilities. He also has the ability to "within limitations" vanish and reappear elsewhere at will. If he knows the path, he can come out from anything or into anything regardless of how close it is bound or even if it is soldered shut.

He has amassed cunning and wisdom throughout centuries, and he is unable to die by the mere passing of time alone.

He can command animals such as rats, owls, bats, moths, foxes and wolves. However, his control over these animals is limited, as seen when the party first enters his house in London. Although Dracula is able to summon thousands of rats to swarm and attack the group, Holmwood summons his trio of terriers to do battle with the rats. The dogs prove very efficient rat killers, suggesting they are Manchester Terriers trained for that purpose. Terrified by the dogs' onslaught, the rats flee, and any control which Dracula may have had over them is gone.

Dracula can also manipulate the weather and, within his range, is able to direct the elements, such as storms, fog and mist.

Shapeshifting
Dracula can change form at will, able to grow and become small, his featured forms in the novel being that of a bat, a wolf, a large dog and a fog or mist. When the moonlight is shining, he can travel as elemental dust within its rays. He is able to pass through tiny cracks or crevices while retaining his human form or in the form of a vapour; described by Van Helsing as the ability to slip through a hairbreadth space of a tomb door or coffin. This is also an ability used by his victim Lucy as a vampire. When the party breaks into her tomb, they open the sealed coffin to find her corpse is no longer located within.

Vampirism
One of Dracula's powers is the ability to turn others into vampires by biting them. According to Van Helsing:

The vampire bite itself does not cause death. It is the method vampires use to drain blood of the victim and to increase their influence over them. This is described by Van Helsing:

Victims who are bitten by a vampire and do not die, are hypnotically influenced by them:

Van Helsing later describes the aftermath of a bitten victim when the vampire has been killed:

As Dracula slowly drains Lucy's blood, she dies from acute blood loss and later transforms into a vampire, despite the efforts of Seward and Van Helsing to provide her with blood transfusions.

He is aided by powers of necromancy and divination of the dead, that all who die by his hand may reanimate and do his bidding.

Bloodletting
Dracula requires no other sustenance but fresh human blood, which has the effect of rejuvenating him and allowing him to grow younger. His power is drawn from the blood of others, and he cannot survive without it. Although drinking blood can rejuvenate his youth and strength, it does not give him the ability to regenerate; months after being struck on the head by a shovel, he still bears a scar from the impact.

Dracula's preferred victims are women. Harker states that he believes Dracula has a state of fasting as well as a state of feeding. Dracula does state to Mina, however, that exerting his abilities causes a desire to feed.

Vampire's Baptism of Blood
Count Dracula is depicted as the "King Vampire", and can control other vampires. To punish Mina and the party for their efforts against him, Dracula bites her on at least three occasions. He also forces her to drink his blood; this act curses her with the effects of vampirism and gives him a telepathic link to her thoughts. However, hypnotism was only able to be done before dawn. Van Helsing refers to the act of drinking blood by both the vampire and the victim "the Vampire's Baptism of Blood".

The effects changes Mina physically and mentally over time. A few moments after Dracula attacks her, Van Helsing takes a wafer of sacramental bread and places it on her forehead to bless her; when the bread touches her skin, it burns her and leaves a scar on her forehead. Her teeth start growing longer but do not grow sharper. She begins to lose her appetite, feeling repulsed by normal food, begins to sleep more and more during the day; cannot wake unless at sunset and stops writing in her diary. When Van Helsing later crumbles the same bread in a circle around her, she is unable to cross or leave the circle, discovering a new form of protection.

Dracula's death can release the curse on any living victim of eventual transformation into vampire. However, Van Helsing reveals that were he to escape, his continued existence would ensure that even if he did not victimize Mina further, she would transform into a vampire upon her eventual natural death.

Limitations of his powers
Dracula is much less powerful in daylight and is only able to shift his form at dawn, noon, and dusk (he can shift his form freely at night or if he is at his grave). The sun is not fatal to him, as sunlight does not burn and destroy him upon contact, though most of his abilities cease.

Later interpretations of the character, and vampires in general, would amplify this trait into an outright fatal weakness, making it so that even the first rays of sunrise are capable of reducing a vampire to ash.

He is also limited in his ability to travel, as he can only cross running water at low or high tide. Owing to this, he is unable to fly across a river in the form of a bat or mist or even by himself board a boat or step off a boat onto a dock unless he is physically carried over with assistance. He is also unable to enter a place unless invited to do so by someone of the household, even a visitor; once invited, he can enter and leave the premises at will.

Weaknesses

Thirst
Dracula is commonly depicted with a bloodlust which he is seemingly unable to control. Adaptations sometimes call this uncontrollable state 'the thirst'.

Religious symbolism
There are items which afflict him to the point he has no power and can even calm him from his insatiable appetite for blood. He is repulsed by garlic, as well as sacred items and symbols such as crucifixes, and sacramental bread.

Placing the branch of a wild rose upon the top of his coffin will render him unable to escape it; a sacred bullet fired into the coffin could kill him so that he remain true-dead.

Mountain-ash is also described as a form of protection from a vampire, although the effects are unknown. This was believed to be used as protection against evil spirits and witches during the Victorian era.

Death-sleep
The state of rest to which vampires are prone during the day is described in the novel as a deathlike sleep in which the vampire sleeps open-eyed, is unable to awaken or move, and also may be unaware of any presence of individuals who may be trespassing. Dracula is portrayed as being active in daylight at least once to pursue a victim. Dracula also purchases many properties throughout London 'over the counter' which shows that he does have the ability to have some type of presence in daylight. 

He requires Transylvanian soil to be nearby to him in a foreign land or to be entombed within his coffin within Transylvania in order to successfully rest; otherwise, he will be unable to recover his strength. This has forced him to transport many boxes of Transylvanian earth to each of his residences in London. He is most powerful when he is within his Earth-Home, Coffin-Home, Hell-Home, or any place unhallowed.

Further, if Dracula or any vampire has had their fill in blood upon feeding, they will be caused to rest in this dead state even longer than usual.

Other abilities
While universally feared by the local people of Transylvania and even beyond, Dracula commands the loyalty of Gypsies and a band of Slovaks who transport his boxes on their way to London and to serve as an armed convoy bringing his coffin back to his castle. The Slovaks and Gypsies appear to know his true nature, for they laugh at Harker when he tries to communicate his plight, and betray Harker's attempt to send a letter through them by giving it to the Count.

Dracula seems to be able to hold influence over people with mental disorders, such as Renfield, who is never bitten but who worships Dracula, referring to him over the course of the novel as "Master" and "Lord". Dracula also afflicts Lucy with chronic sleepwalking, putting her into a trance-like state that allows them not only to submit to his will but also seek him and satisfy his need to feed.

Dracula's powers and weaknesses vary greatly in the many adaptations. Previous and subsequent vampires from different legends have had similar vampire characteristics.

Character development subsequent to the novel

Dracula has been portrayed by more actors in more visual media adaptations of the novel than any other horror character. Actors who have played him include Max Schreck, Bela Lugosi, John Carradine, Lon Chaney Jr., Christopher Lee, Francis Lederer, Denholm Elliott, Jack Palance, Louis Jourdan, Rudolf Martin, Frank Langella, Klaus Kinski, Gary Oldman, Leslie Nielsen, George Hamilton, David Niven, Charles Macaulay, Keith-Lee Castle, Gerard Butler, Duncan Regehr, Richard Roxburgh, Marc Warren, Rutger Hauer, Stephen Billington, Thomas Kretschmann, Dominic Purcell, Luke Evans and Claes Bang.
In 2003, Count Dracula, as portrayed by Lugosi in the 1931 film, was named as the 33rd greatest movie villain by the AFI. In 2013, Empire magazine ranked Lee's portrayal as Dracula the 7th Greatest Horror Movie Character of All Time.

The character is closely associated with the western cultural archetype of the vampire, and remains a popular Halloween costume.

 Count Dracula appears in Mad Monster Party? voiced by Allen Swift. This version is shown to be wearing a monocle. Count Dracula is among the monsters that Baron Boris von Frankenstein invites to the Isle of Evil to show off the secret of total destruction and announce his retirement from the Worldwide Organization of Monsters.
 Sesame Street character Count von Count is based on Bela Lugosi's interpretation of Count Dracula and Jack Davis' design for Dracula from Mad Monster Party?.
 Count Dracula appears in Mad Mad Mad Monsters (a "prequel of sorts" to Mad Monster Party?) voiced again by Allen Swift. He and his son are invited by Baron Henry von Frankenstein to attend the wedding of Frankenstein's monster and its mate at the Transylvania Astoria Hotel.
 Dracula is the primary antagonist of the Castlevania video game series, the first two seasons of the Castlevania Netflix series, and the main protagonist of the Lords of Shadow reboot series.
 Count Dracula appears in the Attack of the Killer Tomatoes episode "Spatula, Prinze of Dorkness", voiced by S. Scott Bullock. He relates a tale of how he once gave Dr. Putrid T. Gangreen a serum to transform tomatoes into vampire tomatoes. Though the doctor refused, Zoltan overheard their conversation and, mistaking the word serum for syrup, ingests the serum himself and renaming himself "Spatula, Prinze of Dorkness" who can turn people into vampires by kissing them in the neck (a stipulation that the Censor Lady put into place in fear of showing the biting and bloodshed associated with vampires on a Saturday morning cartoon). This spread to the other tomatoes and the entire town. When the Sun came up and disabled the vampires, Count Dracula in sunblock appears and deemed that the town is not worthy to be vampires. He then gives Chad Finletter the antidote to the vampirism and advises that the tomatoes be squashed immediately.
 Dracula appears as the lead character of Dracula the Un-dead, a novel by Stoker's great-grand nephew Dacre presented as a sequel to the original.
 In the Supernatural episode "Monster Movie", a shapeshifter that Sam and Dean Winchester fight considers his form of Count Dracula (portrayed by Todd Stashwick) his favourite form. It is in this form that Jamie killed him with Sam's gun loaded with silver bullets.
 Count Dracula is the main character of the Hotel Transylvania franchise, voiced by Adam Sandler in the first three movies and by Brian Hull in the fourth movie.
 Dracula, going by an inversion of his name, "Alucard," serves as the main character of the anime and manga series Hellsing and Hellsing Ultimate where he serves Integra Hellsing, Abraham's great-granddaughter, as an anti-vampire warrior devoted to the British Crown.
 Dracula is the primary antagonist of the Showtime series Penny Dreadful, portrayed by Christian Camargo. This version of the character is the brother of Lucifer and, thus, a fallen angel.

Modern and postmodern analyses of the character

Already in 1958, Cecil Kirtly proposed that Count Dracula shared his personal past with the historical Transylvanian-born Voivode Vlad III Dracula of Wallachia, also known as Vlad the Impaler or Vlad Țepeș. Following the publication of In Search of Dracula by Radu Florescu and Raymond McNally in 1972, this supposed connection attracted much popular attention. This work argued that Bram Stoker based his Dracula on Vlad the Impaler.

Historically, the name "Dracula" is the family name of Vlad Țepeș' family, a name derived from a fraternal order of knights called the Order of the Dragon, founded by Sigismund of Luxembourg (king of Hungary and Bohemia, and Holy Roman Emperor) to uphold Christianity and defend the Empire against the Ottoman Turks. Vlad II Dracul, father of Vlad III, was admitted to the order around 1431 because of his bravery in fighting the Turks and was dubbed Dracul (dragon or devil), thus his son became Dracula (son of the dragon). From 1431 onward, Vlad II wore the emblem of the order and later, as ruler of Wallachia, his coinage bore the dragon symbol.

Stoker came across the name Dracula in his reading on Romanian history, and chose this to replace the name (Count Wampyr) that he had originally intended to use for his villain. However, some Dracula scholars, led by Elizabeth Miller, have questioned the depth of this connection as early as 1998. They argue that Stoker in fact knew little of the historic Vlad III, Vlad the Impaler, and that he used only the name "Dracula" and some miscellaneous scraps of Romanian history. Also, there are no comments about Vlad III in the author's working notes.

While having a conversation with Jonathan Harker in Chapter 3, Dracula refers to his own background, and these speeches show elements which Stoker directly copied from An Account of the Principalities of Wallachia and Moldavia: With Various Political Observations Relating to Them by William Wilkinson. Stoker mentions the Voivode of the Dracula race who fought against the Turks after the defeat in the Battle of Kosovo, and was later betrayed by his brother, historical facts which unequivocally point to Vlad III, described as "Voïvode Dracula" by Wilkinson:

The Count's intended identity is later commented by Professor Van Helsing, referring to a letter from his friend Arminius:

This indeed encourages the reader to identify the Count with the Voivode Dracula first mentioned by him in Chapter 3, the one betrayed by his brother: Vlad III Dracula, betrayed by his brother Radu the Handsome, who had chosen the side of the Turks. But as noted by the Dutch author Hans Corneel de Roos, in Chapter 25, Van Helsing and Mina drop this rudimentary connection to Vlad III and instead describe the Count's personal past as that of "that other of his race" who lived "in a later age". By smoothly exchanging Vlad III for a nameless double, Stoker avoided his main character being unambiguously linked to a historical person traceable in any history book.

Similarly, the novelist did not want to disclose the precise site of the Count's residence, Castle Dracula. As confirmed by Stoker's own handwritten research notes, the novelist had a specific location for the Castle in mind while writing the narrative: an empty mountain top in the Transylvanian Kelemen alps near the former border with Moldavia. Efforts to promote the Poenari Castle (ca. 200 km away from the novel's place of action near the Borgo Pass) as the "real Castle Dracula" have no basis in Stoker's writing; although it bears much similarity to the fictional Castle Dracula, no written evidence shows Stoker to have heard of it. Regarding the Bran Castle near Brașov, Stoker possibly saw an illustration of Castle Bran (Törzburg) in Charles Boner's 1865 book on Transylvania, Transylvania: Its Products and Its People. Although Stoker may have been inspired by its romantic appearance, neither Boner, nor Mazuchelli nor Crosse (who also mention Terzburg or Törzburg) associate it with Vlad III; for the site of his fictitious Castle Dracula, Stoker preferred an empty mountain top.

Furthermore, Stoker's detailed notes reveal that the novelist was very well aware of the ethnic and geo-political differences between the "Roumanians" or "Wallachs"/"Wallachians", descendants of the Dacians, and the Székelys or Szeklers, allies of the Magyars or Hungarians, whose interests were opposed to that of the Wallachians. In the novel's original typewritten manuscript, the Count speaks of throwing off the "Austrian yoke", which corresponds to the Szekler political point of view. This expression is crossed out, however, and replaced by "Hungarian yoke" (as appearing in the printed version), which matches the historical perspective of the Wallachians. This has been interpreted by some to mean that Stoker opted for the Wallachian, not the Szekler interpretation, thus lending more consistency to the Romanian identity of his Count: although not identical with Vlad III, the Vampire is portrayed as one of the "Dracula race". However, despite this, Stoker chose the Count to have revealed himself to be a Székely, and not a Wallachian nobleman (the region where the real "Draculas" ruled over).

Screen portrayals

See also
 Elizabeth Báthory
 Carmilla
 Clinical vampirism
 List of fictional vampires
 List of horror film antagonists

References

Bibliography
 Clive Leatherdale (1985) Dracula: the Novel and the Legend. Desert Island Books.
 Bram Stoker (1897) Dracula. Norton Critical Edition (1997) edited by Nina Auerbach and David J. Skal.
 Senf, Carol. Dracula: Between Tradition and Modernism (Twayne, 1998).
 Senf, Carol A. Bram Stoker. University of Wales Press, 2010.

External links

 Bram Stoker Online Full text, PDF and audio versions of Dracula.

 
Dracula characters
Vlad the Impaler
Literary characters introduced in 1897
Fictional alchemists
Fictional characters who can teleport
Fictional characters with immortality
Fictional characters with superhuman strength
Fictional characters with weather abilities
Fictional counts and countesses
Fictional Hungarian people
Fictional hypnotists and indoctrinators
Fictional characters based on real people
Fictional mass murderers
Fictional monsters
Fictional shapeshifters
Fictional therianthropes
Fictional telepaths
Fictional vampires
Male characters in literature
Male characters in film
Male characters in television
Male horror film villains
Male literary villains
Supervillains with their own comic book titles
Mythopoeia
Undead supervillains
Vampire supervillains